The Indian Runner is a 1991 crime drama film written and directed by Sean Penn in his directorial debut. Based on Bruce Springsteen's song "Highway Patrolman", the film depicts the relationship between two brothers who find themselves on opposite sides of the law. It stars David Morse and Viggo Mortensen as the brothers, alongside Valeria Golino, Patricia Arquette, Jordan Rhodes, Dennis Hopper, Charles Bronson, and Sandy Dennis in her final film role.

Plot
The story, set in 1960s Nebraska, involves two very different brothers: small-town deputy sheriff Joe and criminal Frank Roberts.

Before the events of the film, Joe had tried to farm for a living, but was unable to make ends meet, and the bank eventually foreclosed on his property. He became a deputy sheriff as a way to support his young wife, Maria, and child. Joe is a good, conscientious man, but has his own demons to fight with. The opening shot of the film shows a car chase which ends with Joe using his gun to kill a man in self-defense. This results in Joe's conflicted feelings about killing the criminal, as well as the praise and scorn from members of his community from this shooting. Frank, who had been involved with run-ins with the law before going to Vietnam, is described by his father as plagued by "restlessness". Upon his return to town, he breaks into his brother's home and is nearly shot by Joe's wife. The next day, Frank leaves town without ever stopping by his parents' home. As Joe states in the narration, Frank was correct in his assessment that his parents would understand, as they always seem to when he hurts those who love him.

Joe does not hear from his brother for some time, but eventually discovers from their father that he is in jail in another state. He had kept the information quiet to avoid upsetting their mother. Frank is then released from prison and returns to his hometown with his pregnant girlfriend, Dorothy. Joe's and Frank's mother dies and their father commits suicide soon after. Frank tries to settle down and works in construction, but keeps getting into trouble with the law, which puts him in conflict with Joe. When the time comes for Frank's wife to give birth, Frank is in a bar "drinking it down," which sparks a confrontation with Joe. After Joe leaves, Frank beats the bartender to death with a chair and drives out of town with Joe on his tail. The film concludes with Joe allowing Frank to escape across the state line.

Cast

 David Morse as Joe Roberts
 Trevor Endicott as 12-year-old Joe
 Viggo Mortensen as Frank Roberts
 Brandon Fleck as 7-year-old Frank
 Valeria Golino as Maria Roberts
 Patricia Arquette as Dorothy
 Charles Bronson as Mr. Roberts
 Sandy Dennis as Mrs. Roberts
 Dennis Hopper as Caesar
 Jordan Rhodes as Randall

Additional cast members include Benicio del Toro as Miguel and Harry Crews and Eileen Ryan as the Bakers.

Production
The film was shot partially in Plattsmouth, Nebraska, and Omaha, Nebraska. Joe wears the uniform of a Cass County Sheriff's Deputy in the film.

Producer Don Phillips gave Penn's screenplay to two producers, who liked it but felt that the ending was not commercial enough to interest a Hollywood studio. Phillips' friend Thom Mount, who had his own production company and was a big fan of Penn's work, thought that they might interest a studio if they could get a movie star like Tom Cruise interested in appearing in the film. Penn spotted Mortensen in the film Fresh Horses and was drawn to the actor's "angularity, a severity to his handsomeness," that he thought would be perfect for the role of Frank.

Penn and Phillips sent Mortensen the script while he was making Young Guns II in Tucson, Arizona and flew there to meet with him. The actor agreed to star in Penn's film. Penn had Morse and Mortensen rehearse their pivotal scene in a bar for two weeks. The director had a bar set up in a gymnasium which allowed the actors to blow off steam by shooting baskets in between rehearsals. While making the film, Penn felt that Mortensen's "inherent kindness" was too visible and had him work with a member of the Hells Angels motorcycle club that the director knew in order to acquire an edginess that Penn felt necessary for the character.

The Indian Runner is the last film to feature Sandy Dennis, who died six months after it was released to cinemas. Viggo Mortensen said in an interview several years after her death that during post-production, Sean Penn cut a scene in which she had eight pages of dialogue. In the long scene, Joe and Frank visit their terminally ill mother and their father. Penn decided he could improve the movie if Frank seems cold enough to avoid visiting her even though she is dying, and cut the scene. Dennis appears in a short scene in which she and her husband, played by Charles Bronson, are visited by Joe only.  Quoting Mortensen directly about Dennis,

US political strategist Steve Bannon was an executive producer of The Indian Runner.

Reception

Critical response
The Indian Runner was, for the most part, positively received. It has a 'fresh' rating of 74% on Rotten Tomatoes. Roger Ebert of the Chicago Sun-Times gave the film a positive review, writing that Joe and Frank represent not only the two sides of manhood in society, but also, possibly, the two sides of Sean Penn's own character.

References

External links

 
 
 

1991 films
1991 crime drama films
American crime drama films
English-language Japanese films
Films scored by Jack Nitzsche
Films based on songs
Films directed by Sean Penn
Films set in Nebraska
Films set in the 1960s
Films shot in Nebraska
American independent films
Japanese crime drama films
Metro-Goldwyn-Mayer films
Japanese independent films
1991 directorial debut films
1991 independent films
Bruce Springsteen
Films about brothers
1990s English-language films
1990s American films
1990s Japanese films